Stearalkonium chloride is a type of benzalkonium chloride which is used as an anti-static agent, a surfactant and an antimicrobial.  It is an ingredient in some cosmetics and hair care products, particularly conditioners.  It was originally designed by the fabric industry for use as a fabric softener. 

Toxicology studies have determined that stearalkonium chloride is safe and non-toxic at the concentrations typically used in cosmetic products (0.1 to 5%).  At higher concentrations (25% solution), it has been shown to cause minor skin and eye irritation in animals.

See also
 
 , an alternative preservative for contact lens solutions

References

Quaternary ammonium compounds
Cosmetics chemicals
Cationic surfactants
Benzyl compounds